An LGBT community centre (American spelling: LGBT community center), or pride center (from gay pride), is a building which hosts services for non-heterosexual youth, seniors, adult men and women, and trans individuals, as well as an organization which owns and maintains such a building on a non-profit, non-political basis.

Functions
Common focuses for LGBT community center activities include
 provision of material for people who are discovering their sexuality or gender identity
 provision of material and services for LGBT people who suffer from AIDS/HIV and other sexually-transmitted diseases
 hosting cultural events, including the beginnings of local pride parades, sporting events, and other cultural outings
 hosting fundraisers and drives for community empowerment and LGBT rights purposes
 hosting town hall meetings between LGBT residents of the area and important figures, i.e., politicians, businesspeople, religious leaders, activists, etc.
 serve as archives or museums for the LGBT history of a region
A number of LGBT community centers are youth-centric "drop-in" establishments, allowing usage or participation by young people aged 30 or lower.

Geography and history
LGBT community centers are often the most visible LGBT institutions in high-density municipal areas where gay villages are not in effective establishment (e.g., in Israel, where municipal community centers are established without the presence of a high LGBT demographic concentration); as a result of such local visibility, LGBT community centers often have come under both verbal and violent attack from anti-LGBT individuals and groups.

Opened in 1970, the Pride Center of the Capital Region in Albany, New York is the oldest LGBTQ community center in the United States still operating from their original location. The LAGLC, was established in 1971 in Los Angeles, followed in close succession by other community centers in San Diego (1973), Chicago (1973), Salt Lake City (1975), and Atlanta (1976). The first LGBT community centre in the United Kingdom was the Birmingham Gay Community Centre which opened in 1976, with the London Lesbian and Gay Centre following in 1985. More were established in the coming decades in major cities throughout the Western world and Westernized countries due to the increasing visibility and respectability of LGBT cultures and society.

In a few countries, LGBT community centers and their operators have federated into voluntary organizations for coordination purposes, i.e. CenterLink and the French Federation of LGBT Centres.

See also
 Gay village
 List of LGBT community centres

References

LGBT community centres